Attayampalayam is a village in Erode district of Tamil Nadu, India.

"Texvalley", an industrial area for textile related business development, is located near to this place.

Neighborhoods
Nasiyanur
Perundurai
Chithode
Lakshmi Nagar
Bhavani
Komarapalayam
Erode
Thiruvaachi
Moolakkarai

Location 
It is located along National Highway 47 between (~1.5 km north of) Nasiyanur and (~4 km south of) Chithode.

Administration
Attayampalayam is a part of Nasiyanur Town Panchayat, Erode West MLA constituency,  and Erode MP constituency.

Demography
Major communities living in this village are Kongu Vellalar, Navithar, Nadar, Kuyavar and Adi Dravida.

Occupation
Attayampalayam is ancestor farm of Thiru.Komarasamy Gounder. Currently, the Garden belongs to his grandsons - Majority of the population are engaged in agriculture, real-estate  and related works. Also some people are engaged in handloom and some get deployed in corporate sectors over world. Of late, people are going to work in nearby towns, Erode and Perundurai. It is an ever green place where turmeric and sugarcane fields are surrounded by it.

References

Villages in Erode district